Mathias Mongenast (12 July 1843 – 10 January 1926) was a Luxembourgish politician.  He was the ninth Prime Minister of Luxembourg, serving for twenty-five days, from 12 October 1915 until 6 November 1915. He was Director-General (Minister) of Finance from October 1882 to November 1915.

See also 
 Mongenast Ministry

|-

|-

|-

Ministers for Finances of Luxembourg
Prime Ministers of Luxembourg
Ministers for Foreign Affairs of Luxembourg
Presidents of the Council of State of Luxembourg
Members of the Chamber of Deputies (Luxembourg)
Members of the Council of State of Luxembourg
Luxembourgian jurists
Luxembourgian people of World War I
1843 births
1926 deaths
People from Diekirch
19th-century Luxembourgian people